Edgar Ray Kellogg (November 15, 1905 – July 5, 1976) was an American special effects artist and film director from Iowa.

Career

During World War II, Kellogg was a US Navy Lieutenant with the  O.S.S. Field Photographing Branch where he became acquainted with John Ford.

Following the war Kellogg went to Hollywood working in special effects for 20th Century Fox, eventually heading the unit.  He made his debut as a director with The Killer Shrews and The Giant Gila Monster in 1959. Both films would later be parodied in Mystery Science Theater 3000.

He co-directed The Green Berets in 1968 with John Wayne, a controversial war film set during the then conflict in Vietnam that involved the US Army.   

In 1969, Kellogg appeared in a Petticoat Junction episode (Joe Saves the Post Office, S6/Ep20).  He was the Whitehouse Security Guard, towards the end of the show.

He died in Ontario, California of cancer.

Filmography

Director
The Killer Shrews (1959)
The Giant Gila Monster (1959)
My Dog, Buddy (1960)
The Green Berets - co-directed with John Wayne and Mervyn LeRoy (1968)

Producer
That Justice Be Done (1945)
The Red Pony (TV) (1973)

Sources

External links

1905 births
1976 deaths
American film directors
American film producers
Deaths from cancer in California
People of the Office of Strategic Services
20th-century American businesspeople
People from Iowa
United States Navy personnel of World War II